Uwe Messerschmidt (born 22 January 1962) is a retired track cyclist and road bicycle racer from Germany, who was a professional rider from 1993 to 1997. He represented West Germany at the 1984 Summer Olympics in Los Angeles, California, where he won the silver medal in the men's points race behind Belgium's Roger Ilegems.

References

External links
 

1962 births
Living people
People from Schwäbisch Gmünd
Sportspeople from Stuttgart (region)
German male cyclists
Cyclists at the 1984 Summer Olympics
Cyclists at the 1988 Summer Olympics
Olympic cyclists of West Germany
Olympic silver medalists for West Germany
Olympic medalists in cycling
Cyclists from Baden-Württemberg
Medalists at the 1984 Summer Olympics